Yenikənd (also Yenikend), is a village in Agsu Rayon, Azerbaijan.  The village forms part of the municipality of Gürcüvan.

References 

Populated places in Agsu District